The 2011–12 Ukrainian First League was the 21st since its establishment. Eighteen teams competed in the competition. Two teams were promoted from the 2010–11 Ukrainian Second League.
Two teams were relegated from the 2010–11 Ukrainian Premier League

The competition began on July 16, 2011 with seven matches. The competition had a winter break starting on November 22, 2011 and the competition resumed on March 24, 2012 and completed on May 30, 2012.

Team changes

Promoted teams

These two teams were promoted from the 2010–11 Ukrainian Second League
Group A
MFK Mykolaiv – Second League champion (returning after three seasons)

Group B
Olimpik Donetsk – Second League champion (debut)

Relegated teams 
Two teams were relegated from the 2010–11 Ukrainian Premier League

 FC Sevastopol – 15th place (returning after a season)
 Metalurh Zaporizhzhia – 16th place (debut)

Renamed teams 

 Dnister Ovidiopol moved their operations to Odesa and renamed themselves to FC Odesa.
 Zakarpattia Uzhhorod was renamed to Hoverla-Zakarpattia Uzhhorod.

Team locations

Map 
The following displays the location of teams.

Stadiums 
The following stadiums were used during the season.

Managers

Managerial changes

League table

Withdrawn Teams

Enerhetyk Burshtyn 
On 22 May the president of Enerhetyk Burshtyn informed that the Round 32 match in Vinnytsia was the last match as a professional club and that the will not be competing in the last two games of the season. The rest of Enerhetyk's fixtures (2 games) are considered technical losses. The club played 32 games in the League and had a record of 5 wins, 4 draws and 23 losses with 26 goals scored and 72 against.

FC Lviv 
Prior to the start of the 2012–13 Ukrainian Second League season the Sporting Director of the club informed the PFL that they are withdrawing from the league due to termination of their financial sponsor.

Nyva Vinnytsia 

The club originally informed the PFL that they were to withdraw from the league when the draw for the 2012–13 season was made due to insufficient funds.(5 July 2012) However, the city and the oblast administration informed the PFL guaranteeing sufficient funds for the next season.(10 July 2012) The club was to participate in the 2012–13 Ukrainian Second League competition after readmission to the PFL but was dissolved not submitting proper documentation or license fees and was omitted from the competition.(13 July 2012)

Relegation playoff
The relegation playoff match was played between the 16th place team of the First League and the winner of another playoff game between the second placed clubs from each group of the Second League.

MFK Mykolaiv remain in the First League

Results

Top scorers

See also
 2011–12 Ukrainian Second League
 2011–12 Ukrainian Premier League

References

Ukrainian First League seasons
2011–12 in Ukrainian association football leagues
Uk